SUPER BASIC, sometimes SBASIC for short, is an advanced dialect of the BASIC programming language offered on Tymshare's SDS 940 systems starting in 1968 and available well into the 1970s.

Like the Dartmouth BASIC it was based on, SUPER BASIC was a compile and go language, as opposed to an interpreter. In addition to offering most of the commands and functions from Dartmouth BASIC Version 4, in including matrix math commands, SUPER BASIC also included a number of features from the seminal JOSS language developed at Rand Corporation, via Tymshare's version, CAL, and added a variety of new functions, complex numbers as a built-in type, and double precision support.

These were later used in DEC's BASIC-PLUS, which was later used as the basis for the original Microsoft BASIC that saw widespread use in the 1980s.

History
The original Dartmouth BASIC was released in 1964 but was largely experimental at the time. It went through several revisions before becoming truly useful with the Fourth Edition when it was ported to the GE 635 machine and was published in 1968. Dartmouth specifically placed the underlying design in the public domain, so that anyone could port it to their platforms and call it BASIC. Its spread was further helped by the tireless efforts of its authors to promote it. However, as the code was designed to run on the DTSS operating system, some porting was required to run it on production systems. This led to a proliferation of versions with minor differences.

Tymshare was formed within the University of California, Berkeley, initially renting out time on the University's computers on off-hours. Tymshare's original BASIC, simply Tymshare BASIC, was based on source code "from elsewhere" in the University, that Dan Lewis began enhancing. Frank Bracher added the routines for file input/output (I/O), which made it far more practical than the original Dartmouth code that relied purely on  statements embedded in the program. Dartmouth's workflow was tape based so loading and saving individual files was not practical and direct I/O was not addressed until later versions. Bracher's I/O code had originally been developed for Tymshare's SUPER FORTRAN offering.

One oft-noted feature of the system was the documentation, written by Caroline Diehl. The manuals were written in a conversational style.

Tymshare maintained SUPER BASIC through the 1970s, but as the market for rented timeshare programming services dwindled the system went into maintenance and Lewis and Bracher left to do SUPER BASIC consulting for those companies still using it. Maintenance within Tymshare passed primarily to Walter Main.

Tymshare filed for a trademark on SUPER BASIC on 7 January 1970, and refreshed it on 17 October 1977, which became the property of McDonnell Douglas in 1984 when the company purchased Tymshare.

Language

Direct and indirect mode
Like most BASIC systems of the era, SUPER BASIC had a single command line editor that worked both as an interactive language and a program editor. Commands that were typed without a line number were executed immediately, which they referred to as "direct mode". If the same line was prefixed with a line number, it was instead copied into the program code storage area, known as "indirect mode". New lines were added to the program if the line number was unique, replaced existing lines with the same number, or removed from the program if an existing line number was typed in without any code following it.

Program statements
Line numbers ran from 0 to 999999. The  (or short-form ) could be used to delete a range of lines using typical  notation, for instance, . The  command started an automatic line-number system. The starting number was assumed to be zero if not provided, and the step was 10. For instance,  would produce 0,10,20,...,  would produce 0,5,10,..., and  would produce 10,20,30...  took three parameters, a new starting line number, a range of lines to renumber (like 20-100) and the step.

Although the built-in editor loaded and saved only the lines in the program itself, the user could edit the resulting text file to add additional commands that would run in direct mode. A common example was to edit a program and add  on its own line at the end of the file. This is unusual for BASIC systems, although this was commonly used in JOSS.

Statements
In keeping with the overall Dartmouth BASIC concept, SUPER BASIC was a compile and go system that compiled the source code when the program was run. Remarks could be placed anywhere using .

SUPER BASIC expanded the  statement in several ways. For instance,  will continue as long as X<Y, while  stops when the condition is met. As in Microsoft BASIC, multiple loops could end with a single , although it did not include the feature of later version of MS where the index variable could be left off entirely. Finally, in JOSS fashion, one could replace the typical range specifier  with an explicit list of values, .

This can make some commonly found use-cases easier to understand. One could also use a loop in these cases, which made single one-statement loops easy to implement, for instance . One could also use a "bare"  or  without the for, . The modifiers could also be ganged, .

Expressions

Variables
Variable names could consist of one or two letters or one letter and a digit. SUPER BASIC did not require variables to be typed, a variable could hold a number at one point and a string at another, a side-effect of the way they were stored. This could be addressed by explicitly declaring the variable type using a variety of commands.

In most dialects of BASIC, variables are created on-the-fly as they are encountered in the code, and generally set to zero (or the empty string) when created. This can lead to problems where variables are supposed to be set up by previous code that is not being properly called, but at run time it can be difficult to know if 0 is an uninitialized value or one with the perfectly legal 0 values. SUPER BASIC addressed this with the  command. The later is very useful in debugging scenarios, where the normal behavior can hide the fact that a variable being used in a calculation has not been correctly initialized.

Numeric
Unless otherwise specified, variables were stored in a 48-bit single precision floating point format with eleven digits of precision. This was not a consideration in other BASICs where some sort of suffix, like , indicated the type wherever it was encountered.

An existing single precision value or expression could be converted to double using the  function. For instance, one could force an expression to evaluate using double precision using .

Likewise, one could declare  to produce a one-word 24-bit integer value.

A more unusual addition was direct support for complex numbers. These were set up in a fashion similar to other variables, using  to set aside two single precision slots. A single complex number could be created from two singles using the  function, while  and  extracted the real and imaginary parts, respectively, into singles. A small number of additional utility functions were also offered.

Operators and functions

There were seven basic math operators:

  for exponents - the exponent is converted to a 12-bit integer
  for multiplication
  for division
  for modulo, the remainder of an integer division
  for integer division
  for addition
  for subtraction

SUPER BASIC's list of mathematical functions was longer than most BASICs, including a series of inverse trigonometric functions and logarithms for base 2 and 10.
RND(X), returns a random number using a fixed sequence, can be seeded with RND(-1)
ABS(N), absolute value
SQR(N) or SQRT(N), square root
SIN
COS
TAN
ASIN
ACOS
ATN or ATAN
ATN/ATAN with two variables, (y,x) calculates y/x and returns ATN of that
SINH
COSTH
TANH
LOG
LGT/LOG10
LOG2
EXP
EXP2
INT, as in BASIC, always truncates downward
FIX, similar to INT but simply truncating the decimal
ROUND, rounds the value to closest, unlike INT
COMP(X,Y) COMPare, combines a subtraction and SGN, so if X>Y=1, X=Y=0, X<y+-1
PDIF(X,Y) Positive DIFference, returns difference (X-Y) if X>Y, 0 otherwise
SUPER BASIC included a number of functions from JOSS as well:
IP(), Integer Part, equivalent to INT
FP(), Fraction Part, same as X-INT(X)
MAX(...) returns the maximum value from a list of entries
MIN(...) returns the minimum

Arrays and matrix math
In addition to basic math, SUPER BASIC included array functionality like many other BASIC implementations. One could  to make a two-dimensional array, and as a consequence of the way they were stored, all variables otherwise undeclared were actually DIMed to have ten indexes, so one could  without previously DIMing B.

In contrast with other BASICs, SUPER BASIC allowed one to define the range of one or both of the dimensions, assuming 1 if not defined. So A in the example above has indexes 1..5, but one might also  to produce an array that has 11 indexes from -5 to +5 for X, and 0 to +5 for Y. One could also use the  command to change the default, so , for example, makes all dimensions start at 0.

In addition to these traditional BASIC concepts, SUPER BASIC also included most of the matrix math features found in later versions of Dartmouth BASIC. These were invoked by adding the keyword  to the front of other commands. For instance,  multiplies all the items in array B by their corresponding item in C, whereas  multiplies all the elements in B by 5. Functions for common matrix operations like inversion and identity were included.

Binary math and logical values

The much-greater-than and much-less-than operators compared the values of the two operands, for instance, A and B in the expression . If adding B to A results in A being unchanged after the inherent rounding,  returned true. , the close-to-equals, simply compared both values to an internal meta-variable, performing .

Most dialects of BASIC allow the result of such logical comparisons to be stored in variables, using some internal format to represent the logical value, often 0 for false and 1 or -1 for true.

In contrast to logical comparisons and operators, SUPER BASIC also added a number of bitwise logical operators. These applied a basic logical operation to the individual bits in a word. To ease the entry of binary values, constants could be entered in octal format by prefixing a number with an "O", like .

Strings

In contrast to later dialects of BASIC, one could assign a string to any variable and the  signifier was not used, so  was valid. This could lead to some confusion when a user provided a value combining digits and letters, and SUPER BASIC assumed anything starting with a digit was a number. To guide the system when this might result in confusing input, one could explicitly declare string variables using . As with all variables in SUPER BASIC, these could be arrays, . Additionally, SUPER BASIC added the additional statement  which took a second parameter to define the length of the string elements, so  makes an array with 12 elements of 10 characters each, while  is an array of six elements, 5..10, each 15 characters long.

String operators and functions
It included the following functions:

Utility functions
Typical utility functions are also included:
POS returns the column of the print head
POS(X) returns the position in a file
TAB(X) moves the print head to column X
TAB(X,N) the same in file number N
DATE
TIME

Print formatting
Field type included integers, specified decimal formats, and exponents, as well as strings and text.  signs indicated a single digit in either an integer or real field, and  indicated a digit in an E field.  and  could be used to prefix any value.

 worked generally the same way, the difference being that spaces had to be explicitly defined using . Thus the format string  would print two numerical values with three spaces between them, whereas if this was an image the  would be printed out with a space on either side. The  version supported a wider variety of format strings and included items like inline carriage returns, but the examples given in the manuals do not make it clear why there are two such systems when they accomplish the same thing in the end.

File I/O
When working with files, one could read the next-read location using  and change it using .  returned the position within a form if  was being used.  returned the file size. The  could be used in loops to test whether the end of the file was reached during reads.

The system also included a function  that returned whether or not there was input waiting in the terminal. SUPER BASIC programs often included code like  to wait for user input and test it every second before continuing. Additionally, it included a pseudo-filename  that could be opened for reading and writing using  and then .

Notes

References

Citations

Bibliography
 
 

BASIC programming language family
Tymshare software